Ezequiel Fernández may refer to:
 Ezequiel Fernández (Panamanian politician) (1886–1946), acting president of Panama
 Ezequiel Fernández Langan (born 1978), Argentine lawyer and politician
 Ezequiel Fernández (footballer) (born 2002), Argentine footballer